Colin Anderson Stein (born 10 May 1947) is a Scottish former footballer, who played for Hibernian, Rangers (two spells), Coventry City and Kilmarnock. Stein was part of the Rangers team that won the 1971–72 UEFA Cup Winners' Cup, and he scored one of the goals in a 3–2 victory against Dinamo Moscow in the final. Stein also represented Scotland and the Scottish League XI. He scored nine goals in 21 appearances for Scotland, including four goals in a 1970 FIFA World Cup qualification match against Cyprus.

Career
Stein, who was born in Linlithgow, began his career with Armadale Thistle. He went on to play professionally for Hibernian, Rangers and the Scottish national team during the 1960s and 1970s. He also had a spell in England with Coventry City. He played an important part in Rangers winning the 1972 UEFA Cup Winners' Cup Final, scoring the opening goal in the final. Rangers beat Stade Rennais, Sporting CP, Torino, Bayern Munich and Dinamo Moscow to win the competition.

On 2 January 1971, during an Old Firm match at Ibrox, Stein scored an equaliser in stoppage time to salvage a draw for Rangers after Celtic had taken the lead in the 89th minute. Minutes later after full-time, barriers on Stairway 13 at Ibrox gave way, causing a chain-reaction pileup of spectators that killed 66 and injured over 200 in what would be remembered as the second Ibrox disaster. Initial reports speculated that Rangers supporters who had left the ground turned back upon hearing the crowd roar at Stein's goal, leading to the disaster. The official inquiry into the tragedy conclusively proved that all the spectators were moving in the same direction at the time of the collapse, however.

Stein registered a hat-trick for Scotland in 1969, when he scored four goals in a match against Cyprus. He held the distinction of being the last player to score a hat-trick for Scotland until 2015, when Steven Fletcher scored three times against Gibraltar. Stein won a total of 21 caps for Scotland, scoring nine goals.

In the twilight of his career, after leaving Kilmarnock, Stein also played for Elgin City, who were then a Highland League side.

Personal life
His elder brother, Bobby Stein, was also a professional footballer.

Career statistics

International appearances

International goals

Scores and results list Scotland's goal tally first

See also
 List of Scotland national football team hat-tricks

Notes

References

External links

International stats at Londonhearts.com

1947 births
Armadale Thistle F.C. players
Association football forwards
Coventry City F.C. players
Elgin City F.C. players
Hibernian F.C. players
Kilmarnock F.C. players
Living people
People from Linlithgow
Rangers F.C. players
Scotland international footballers
Scotland under-23 international footballers
Scottish Football League players
Scottish Football League representative players
Scottish footballers
Scottish Junior Football Association players
Footballers from West Lothian
English Football League players
Scottish league football top scorers
Highland Football League players
Scottish Football Hall of Fame inductees